Ho! is a 1968 French-Italian crime film directed by Robert Enrico and starring Jean-Paul Belmondo. It is based on the 1964 novel Ho! by José Giovanni.

The film recorded admissions of 1,774,340 in France.

Plot
The race car driver François Holin, nicknamed Ho (Jean-Paul Belmondo) abandons his sport after his friend is killed because of him and becomes part of a gang of bank robbers. Other members of the gang – the Schwartz brothers, treat him with contempt but work with him because without a good getaway driver their plans are doomed to failure. During preparation for the next robbery the leader of the gang is killed, and Ho intends to take his place to carry out the robbery. As usual, the first part of the plan is carjacking which is entrusted to Ho. But the police manage to seize him and he is sent to prison. There he sits in a cell with a bum who has received a mere 1,5 months sentence and begins to impersonate him. After 1,5 months pass the guards can no longer distinguish one from the other and Ho manages to get out of jail instead of the tramp. Immediately he creates false documents for himself and returns to the old apartment of his gang. The next day all the newspapers publish front-page articles about the daring escape, calling Holin public enemy number one, a man with nerves of steel, and state that while such a brilliant criminal is on the loose, the criminal world is invincible. Thus the police with the help of journalists hope to provoke Holin to rash acts unaware of his excessive vanity. But he unravels their plan and forces the author of these articles to write the truth. Moreover Holin intends to implement a plan that they developed before his arrest, but the Schwartz brothers refuse to work with him as they have already found a replacement for him. Then Holin goes in search of new associates and finds three small time robbers, who offer participation in a bank robbery. They succeed in the robbery, but soon the police are out on the Holin’s trail, knowing his weakness for expensive ties and set up ambushes in stores. Trying to escape from persecution Holin again faces the Schwartz brothers who are trying to take away his stolen money. This costs the life of the brothers and the girlfriend of Holin, a well-known model. Holin again ends up in the hands of the police again.

Cast 
 Jean-Paul Belmondo as François Holin
 Joanna Shimkus as Bénédicte
 Raymond Bussières as Robert
 Paul Crauchet as Gabriel Briand
  Stéphane Fey  as  Schwartz Junior
 Alain Mottet as Paul
  Tony Taffin  as Old Schwartz
  André Weber  as La Praline
 Jackie Sardou as Mado
  Bob Ingarao as  Schneider 
  Pierre Leproux  as Roger
  Jean-Paul Tribout  as  Falsten
 Sydney Chaplin as Canter
 Jean-Pierre Castaldi as Bénédicte's friend
 Alain Delon as Man at airport

Reception
Time Out said it was for "indulgent Belmondo fans only", and called it a turgid effort "from the time when the star could churn out any old rubbish and still clean up at the French box office."

References

External links

Ho! at Le Film Guide

1968 films
Films based on works by José Giovanni
Films directed by Robert Enrico
Films scored by François de Roubaix
French auto racing films
French crime films
1968 crime films
Films with screenplays by José Giovanni
1960s French films
1970s French films